Uranothauma lunifer is a butterfly in the family Lycaenidae. It is found in south-western Uganda, the Democratic Republic of the Congo (from the eastern part of the country to Kivu), Rwanda and western Tanzania.

References

Butterflies described in 1914
Uranothauma